Luísa Beirão (born 29 August 1977 in Sever do Vouga) is a Portuguese model. She was a spokesmodel of Nivea and Coca-Cola in Portugal.

Private life 
Luísa married Portuguese football player Miguel Pedrosa in June 1999. The couple is now divorced. Beirão has since been in a relationship with Gonçalo Santana Lopes, the oldest son of former Portuguese Prime Minister Pedro Santana Lopes.

References

See also
 
 
 

1977 births
Living people
People from Aveiro District
Portuguese female models